Bongcheon Station is a station on the Seoul Subway Line 2. It is located in Bongcheon-dong, Gwanak-gu, Seoul, South Korea, close to Gwanaksan Mountain.

Station layout

References

Railway stations opened in 1984
Seoul Metropolitan Subway stations
Metro stations in Gwanak District
1984 establishments in South Korea
20th-century architecture in South Korea